Baraya is a town and municipality in the Huila Department of Colombia.

References

Municipalities of Huila Department